Alfie Sean Devine (born 1 August 2004) is an English professional footballer who plays as a midfielder for  club Tottenham Hotspur.

Early life
Devine was born on 1 August 2004 in Warrington. He is the son of Claire Devine, a Human Resources professional and former rugby league  Sean Devine, who played for St Helens from 1986 to 1991, and Oldham from 1992 to 1993.

Club career
Devine was an academy player of Liverpool. He was released when he was 11 and, four months later, he joined Wigan Athletic. He made his under-23 debut aged 15, and was part of the team that beat Tottenham Hotspur in the fourth round of the 2019–20 FA Youth Cup, coming on as a late substitute. He started in the quarter-final against Manchester United at Old Trafford. He was signed by Wigan on 6 June 2020. However, Wigan went into administration less than a month later, and he was then sold to Tottenham Hotspur on 28 July for around £300,000.

Devine played in the U23 match against Chelsea in December 2020, where he made a tackle on Danny Drinkwater and became involved in a physical confrontation with Drinkwater. Both players were sent off.

On 10 January 2021, Devine made his senior debut for Tottenham in the third round match of the FA Cup against Marine. He came on as a substitute at the start of the second half and scored a goal, capping a 5–0 win for Tottenham. His debut at 16 years and 163 days made him the youngest player to have played for Tottenham in a senior game, breaking the record previously held by his under-18 teammate Dane Scarlett.

International career
Devine represented England at under-16 level, playing at the Sportchain AGS Cup in December 2019; the tournament was won by Spain, but he was named player of the tournament.

On 2 September 2021, Devine made his debut for the England U19s during a 2–0 victory over Italy U19s at St. George's Park. 

On 17 June 2022, Devine was included in the England U19 squad for the 2022 UEFA European Under-19 Championship. He scored in their opening group game against Austria. Devine started in the final as England won the tournament with a 3-1 extra time victory over Israel on 1 July 2022.

Career statistics

Honours
England U19s

 UEFA European Under-19 Championship: 2022

References

External links
 
 

2004 births
Living people
Footballers from Warrington
English footballers
Association football midfielders
Tottenham Hotspur F.C. players
England youth international footballers